The following is a list of the original soundtracks and singles from the Japanese manga series Beck, and its anime and live-action film adaptations.

Songs

Beat Crusaders - Hit in the USA
The anime's opening theme song.
Beat Crusaders - Hit in the USA
Beat Crusaders - Super Collider
Beat Crusaders - B.A.D.

Meister - Above The Clouds
The anime's first ending theme song.
Meister - Above The Clouds
Meister - My World Down

Beat Crusaders - Moon on the Water
The anime's second ending theme song. Lyrics written by Sowelu. Was not released as an actual single.
Beat Crusaders - Moon on the Water

Original soundtracks

Greatful Sound: Tribute to Beck

Greatful Sound: Tribute to Beck was released as a promotional collectible for the Beck manga. The title "Greatful Sound" comes from the music festival featured in the series.

Choke Sleeper - Leave Me Alone
Nice Marbles - Furouto
Smorgas - Dead Man
Loop-Line - Flow
Badfish - Up Set Vibration
Beratrek with Poly-1 from Polysics - Let's Groove or Die
54 Nude Honeys - Fat Liver
Bazra[ja] - Yureru
Coaltar of the Deepers - h.s.k.s.
Rumtag - Melody

Beck: Animation Beck Soundtrack

Beck: Animation Beck Soundtrack is the first soundtrack album for the anime adaptation of the Beck manga. It contains all the songs used in the anime (excluding instrumental background scores). Most of the music on this album was done by Beat Crusaders working with the characters' voice actors, but are credited to the series' fictional bands, such as Beck and The Dying Breed.

Beck - Brainstorm
Beck - Spice of Life
Chounaikaichuu no Musuko Band - Mad House
Maho Minami - Sly
Beck - Face
Belle Ame - Lost Melody
Rocket Boys - Follow Me
Kuniyoshi Chiemi - Genki wo Dashite
The Dying Breed feat. Yukio Tanaka - Moon on the Water
Beck - Like A Foojin
Ciel Bleu - Youkai Ningen Bem
Hyoudou Band - Gymnasium
Tsunemi Chiba - Reloaded
Musicmans feat. Manabu Miyazawa - Journey
Saitou San Band feat. Koyuki Tanaka & Maho Minami - Follow Me
The Dying Breed - My World Down
Hyoudou Band 2 - Love Dischord
Beck - By Her
Beck - I've Got a Feeling (The Beatles cover)
Beck - Slip Out
Koyuki Tanaka & Maho Minami - Moon on the Water
The Pillows - Last Dinosaur (Ep. 26 - The Heroes band with Taira)

Keith: Animation Beck Soundtrack

Keith: Animation Beck Soundtrack is the second soundtrack album for the anime adaptation of the Beck manga. It contains the hit songs from the first soundtrack in their original forms, prior to the anime's covers of them.

Typhoon24 feat. Tatsuzo of YKZ - Spice of Life
Tropical Gorilla - Big Muff
Up Hold - Endless Traveling Map
Goofy's Holiday - Piece of Tears
Typhoon24 Feat. Tatsuzo of YKZ - Like a Foojin
Goofy's Holiday - Journey
Beat Crusaders - 50¢ Wisdom
Husking Bee - Brightest
Sister - Face
Meister - I Call You Love
10-Feet - Little More Than Before
Beat Crusaders - Moon on the Water

Beck: The Movie Soundtrack

Beck: The Movie Soundtrack is the soundtrack album for the live-action film adaptation of the Beck manga. Almost all of the song are instrumental.

Kotringo - Koyuki
Suble - Wait a Minute
Robert Gabriel - The Promise
Kotringo - Dash
Robert Gabriel - The Contact
Yamaruku Manchester - Maho's Ringtone
Shigekazu Aida - Charlie Don't Surf
Takeshi Shibuya feat. Curly Giraffe - Candy Girl
Robert Gabriel - Sudden Attack
Suble - Day Labor Blues
Suble - Fist of Fury
Kotringo - Koyuki and Saku
Suble - Large Global Expansion Strategy
Kotringo - Kiss~School
Robert Gabriel - Burned Pride
Yassy - Now on Sale
Robert Gabriel - The Whole Beginning
Kotringo - Triangle
Robert Gabriel - Bad Feelings
Robert Gabriel - The Abducted
Kotringo - Taikukanmae
Robert Gabriel - The Rapper's Grief
Kotringo - Passing
Robert Gabriel - Let the Battle Begin
Robert Gabriel - The Fight for no Return
Kotringo - The Stage
Kotringo - Koyuki and Maho

References

Anime soundtracks
Film and television discographies
Lists of soundtracks